Sri Lanka is a tropical island situated close to the southern tip of India. The invertebrate fauna is as large as it is common to other regions of the world. There are about 2 million species of arthropods found in the world, and still it is counting. So many new species are discover up to this time also. So it is very complicated and difficult to summarize the exact number of species found within a certain region.

The following list is about Centipedes and Millipedes found in Sri Lanka.

Centipede
Phylum: Arthropoda   Subphylum: Myriapoda
Class: Chilopoda

Centipedes are arthropods belonging to the class Chilopoda of the subphylum Myriapoda. They are elongated metameric creatures with one pair of legs per body segment, where legs ranging from 30 to 354. They always have an odd number of pairs of legs. A pair of venom claws or forcipules formed from a modified first appendage, which indicated that they are predominantly carnivorous.

About 8,000 species of centipedes are thought to exist, of which 3,000 have been described.

The following list provide the centipedes currently identified in Sri Lanka. The first known study on centipedes are came from Newport on 1845. Then many more overseas biologists and naturalists did many studies on centipedes. However, much recent work and the first work by a local biologist was done by Duminda Dissanayake of Rajarata University of Sri Lanka. According to his checklist, there are 19 species from 4 orders and 6 families are known from Sri Lanka.

Endemic species are denoted as E.

Order: Geophilomorpha - Soil centipedes

Family: Mecistocephalidae

Mecistocephalus heteropus
Mecistocephalus subinsularis

Family: Oryidae

Orphnaeus brevilabiatus

Order: Lithobiomorpha - Stone centipedes

Family: Lithobiidae

Australobius palnis
Australobius sculpturatus

Order: Scolopendromorpha - Bark centipedes

Family: Scolopendridae
 

Ethmostigmus rubripes
Otostigmus ceylanicus
Otostigmus scaber
Scolopendra crassa
Scolopendra hardwickei
Scolopendra morsitans
Scolopendra subspinipes
Cormocephalus inermipes
Cormocephalus westwoodi
Rhysida immarginata
Rhysida longipes

Order: Scutigeromorpha - Common house centipedes

Family: Scutigeridae

Thereuopodina tenuicornis

Family: Scutigerinidae

Scutigerina weberi

Millipede
Phylum: Arthropoda   Subphylum: Myriapoda
Class: Diplopoda

Millipedes are arthropods in the class Diplopoda, which is characterised by having two pairs of jointed legs on most body segments. Most millipedes have very elongated cylindrical or flattened bodies with more than 20 segments, while pill millipedes are shorter and can roll into a ball. The average number of legs are about 500 or so, but rarely about 750. Approximately 12,000 species classified into sixteen orders and around 140 families, making Diplopoda the largest class of myriapods.

In 1865, Humbert is the first person to study Sri Lankan millipede fauna, with 26 species, including 19 
new species. In 1892, Pocock discovered 10 more new species of millipedes from many localities. With many gradual taxonomic revisions by Carl, Demange, Hoffman and endemic millipede fauna by Mauriès, a total of 104 millipede species belonging to 44 genera, 18 families and nine orders have been documented. 82 species are endemic to Sri Lanka.

Order: Chordeumatida

Family: Lankasomatidae

Cingalosoma anderssoni - E
Lankasoma anderssoni - E
Lankasoma brincki - E
Lankasoma cederholmi - E
Lankasoma oreites - E
Lankasoma mahleri - E

Order: Glomeridesmida

Family: Glomeridesmidae

Termitodesmus ceylonicus - E

Order: Polydesmida - Flat-backed millipedes

Family: Chelodesmidae
Leptodesmus thwaitesii - E

Family: Cryptodesmidae

Pocodesmus greeni - E
Singhalocryptus alticola - E

Family: Fuhrmannodesmidae

Lankadesmus cognatus - E

Family: Paradoxosomatidae
 
Anoplodesmus anthracinus
Anoplodesmus humberti - E
Anoplodesmus layardi - E
Anoplodesmus luctuosus
Anoplodesmus inornatus - E
Anoplodesmus sabulosus - E
Anoplodesmus saussurii
Anoplodesmus stadelmanni - E
Chondromorpha xanthotricha
Desmoxytes planata
Orthomorpha mikrotropis - E
Paranedyopus simplex - E
Polydesmopeltis kelaarti
Pyragrogonus willeyi - E
Singhalorthomorpha cingalensis - E
Singhalorthomorpha serrulata - E
Strongylosoma greeni - E
Strongylosoma nietneri - E

Family: Polydesmidae
Polydesmus skinneri - E

Family: Pyrgodesmidae
 
Archandrodesmus kandyanus - E
Catapyrgodesmus ceylonicus - E
Cryptocephalopus jonesii - E
Eustaledesmus parvus - E
Klimakodesmus permutatus - E
Pyrgodesmus obscurus - E
Styloceylonius lobatus - E
Urodesmus serratus - E

Order: Polyxenida - Bristle millipedes

Family: Polyxenidae

Silvestrus ceylonicus - E

Order: Sphaerotheriida - Giant pill millipedes

Family: Arthrosphaeridae
 

Arthrosphaera attemsi
Arthrosphaera brandtii
Arthrosphaera corrugata - E
Arthrosphaera dentigera - E
Arthrosphaera inermis
Arthrosphaera leopardina - E
Arthrosphaera noticeps - E
Arthrosphaera pilifera - E
Arthrosphaera ruginosa - E
Arthrosphaera rugosa - E
Arthrosphaera versicolor - E

Family: Zephroniidae

Sphaeropoeus hercules

Order: Siphonophorida

Family: Siphonophoridae

Pterozonium picteti 
Siphonophora humberti - E

Order: Spirobolida - Round-backed millipedes

Family: Pachybolidae

Xenobolus carnifex

Family: Pseudospirobolellidae

Pseudospirobolellus avernus

Family: Spirobolidae

Spirobolus crebristriatus - E
Spirobolus greeni - E
Spirobolus longicollis - E
Spirobolus longicornis - E
Spirobolus obtusospinosus - E
Spirobolus spirostreptinus - E
Spirobolus taprobanensis - E

Family: Trigoniulidae

Cingalobolus bugnioni - E
Lankabolus coelebs - E
Trigoniulus corallinus

Order: Spirostreptida

Family: Cambalopsidae
Trachyjulus aelleni - E
Trachyjulus costatus - E
Trachyjulus humberti - E
Trachyjulus lankanus - E
Trachyjulus minor - E
Trachyjulus willeyi - E
Trachyjulus willeyi montanus - E

Family: Glyphiulidae
Podoglyphiulus ceylanicus - E

Family: Harpagophoridae
 
Carlogonus robustior - E
Harpurostreptus attemsi - E
Harpurostreptus hamifer - E  
Harpurostreptus krausi
Harpurostreptus matarae - E
Humbertostreptus lunelii - E
Ktenostreptus anderssoni - E
Ktenostreptus anulipes - E
Ktenostreptus centrurus - E
Ktenostreptus costulatus - E
Ktenostreptus lankaensis - E
Ktenostreptus rugulosus - E
Ktenostreptus specularis - E 
Leptostreptus caudiculatus
Leptostreptus exiguus - E
Leptostreptus fuscus - E
Phyllogonostreptus nigrolabiatus
Stenurostreptus stenorhynchus - E
Thyropygus allevatus
Thyropygus poseidon - E

Family: Spirostreptidae
Spirostreptus contemptus - E
Spirostreptus insculptus - E
Spirostreptus modestus - E

Order: Julida

Family: Julidae
Julus ceilanicus - E

Order: Stemmiulida

Family: Stemmiulidae

Diopsiulus annandalei - E
Diopsiulus ceylonicus - E
Diopsiulus greeni  - E
Diopsiulus madaraszi - E

References

 
Sri Lanka
Sri Lanka
Myriapods